Gustavo Caamaño (born May 27, 1979) is an Argentine football defender.

Caamaño began his football career at CIA, scoring on his debut. In 2009, he joined club Aldosivi of the Primera B Nacional. In January 2010 he was transferred to Bolivian side Oriente Petrolero under a one-year contract.

External links
 
 

1979 births
Living people
Argentine footballers
Association football defenders
Comisión de Actividades Infantiles footballers
Aldosivi footballers
Oriente Petrolero players
Expatriate footballers in Bolivia